The 1982 NASCAR Winston Cup Series was the 34th season of professional stock car racing in the United States and the 11th modern-era Cup series. The season began on February 14 at the Daytona International Speedway and concluded on November 21 at Riverside International Raceway. Darrell Waltrip took his second straight championship driving for Junior Johnson by 72 points over Bobby Allison.

Teams and drivers

Schedule

Bolded races indicate a NASCAR Crown Jewel race

1982 Non-Points Results (Cup Series Speedweeks)

Busch Clash
The 1982 season unofficially kicked off on February 7 with the non-points fourth annual Busch Clash, open to all pole winners from the 1981 season in a 20 lap dash. Terry Labonte drew pole position

Top Five
88-Bobby Allison
44-Terry Labonte
21-Neil Bonnett
11-Darrell Waltrip
27-Cale Yarborough

Time of Race: 15 minutes, 39 seconds
Caution Flags: None
Margin Of Victory: 1.5 car lengths
Of the 13 drivers that started this race, 11 finished the race and all of those finishers were on the lead lap.
Bobby Allison became the fourth different winner of this annual race. He took home $50,000.

UNO Twin 125 Qualifiers
On February 11 the Uno Twin 125 Mile Qualifiers were held. Benny Parsons was on the pole for race 1 with a speed of 196.317 mph and Harry Gant was on the pole for race 2 with a speed of 195.609 mph.

Race 1 Top Five
27-Cale Yarborough
44-Terry Labonte
88-Bobby Allison
28-Benny Parsons
51-A. J. Foyt

Time of Race: 55 minutes, 26 seconds
Caution Flags: 5 for 17 Laps
Margin Of Victory: 2 car lengths

Race 2 Top Five
1-Buddy Baker
11-Darrell Waltrip
2-Joe Ruttman
15-Dale Earnhardt
42-Kyle Petty

Time of Race: 51 minutes, 54 seconds
Caution Flags: 2 for 12 Laps
Margin Of Victory: Under Caution

Daytona 500 Consolation Race
On February 12, NASCAR allowed all 14 cars that failed to qualify for the Daytona 500 to race in a consolation race at a 30 lap distance. Slick Johnson was on the pole.

Top Five
29-Tim Richmond (R)
48-Slick Johnson
25-Ronnie Thomas
05-Bill Meazell
49-James Hylton

Time of Race: 31 minutes, 17 seconds
Caution Flags: 1 for 6 Laps
Margin Of Victory: 0.21 seconds

1982 Season Results

Daytona 500

The 1982 season officially kicked off on February 14 with the Daytona 500 held at the Daytona International Speedway. Benny Parsons won the pole with a speed of 196.317 mph.

Top Ten
88-Bobby Allison
27-Cale Yarborough
2-Joe Ruttman
44-Terry Labonte
9-Bill Elliott
47-Ron Bouchard
33-Harry Gant
1-Buddy Baker
90-Jody Ridley
30-Roy Smith

Time of Race: 3 hours 14 minutes 49 secondsCaution Flags: 5 for 34 LapsMargin Of Victory: 22.87 seconds
Bobby Allison, who had won the Busch Clash on February 7, would dominate the race leading 147 of 200 laps and cruise to victory. Buick would take seven of the first eight finishing spots. There was controversy in Allison's victory as his bumper fell off early in the race.
This also would be the first time since 1971 that no Chevrolets were in the field.

Richmond 400
The Richmond 400 was run on February 21 at the Richmond Fairgrounds Raceway. Darrell Waltrip won the pole with a speed of 93.256 mph.

Top Ten
71-Dave Marcis
43-Richard Petty
27-Benny Parsons
15-Dale Earnhardt
44-Terry Labonte
50-Joe Millikan
21-Neil Bonnett
88-Bobby Allison
47-Ron Bouchard
98-Morgan Shepherd

Time of Race: 1 hour 51 minutes 30 seconds.Caution Flags: 6 for 33 laps.Margin of Victory: Under CautionRace shortened to 250 of 400 laps due to rain.
Dave Marcis captured the final win of his career and the only victory with his own team.

Valleydale 500
The Valleydale 500 was held on March 14 at the Bristol International Raceway. Darrell Waltrip won the pole with a speed of 111.068 mph.

Top Ten
11-Darrell Waltrip
15-Dale Earnhardt
98-Morgan Shepherd
44-Terry Labonte
88-Bobby Allison
33-Harry Gant
43-Richard Petty
47-Ron Bouchard
28-Benny Parsons
71-Dave Marcis

Time of Race: 2 hours 49 minutes 52 secondsCaution Flags: 3 for 25 lapsMargin of Victory: 13.2 seconds
Darrell Waltrip would go on to win his first race of the season. He and Dale Earnhardt would combine to lead 477 of 500 laps.

Coca-Cola 500
The Coca-Cola 500 was held on March 21 at the Atlanta International Raceway. Dale Earnhardt won the pole with a speed of 163.774 mph.

Top Ten
11-Darrell Waltrip
43-Richard Petty
27-Cale Yarborough
28-Benny Parsons
33-Harry Gant
98-Morgan Shepherd
75-Gary Balough
44-Terry Labonte
62-Rick Wilson
5-Jim Sauter

Time of Race: 3 hours 29 minutes 58 secondsCaution Flags: 7 for 47 lapsMargin of Victory: Under CautionRace shortened to 287 of 328 laps due to rain.
Darrell Waltrip led 33 laps and when rain hit in the final laps he beat Richard Petty by inches to the race-ending yellow. It was Waltrip's second win of the 1982 Winston Cup season.
Dale Earnhardt led 155 laps but finished 28th.
Gary Balough scored his best ever finish of 7th .
This race provided footage for the motion picture Six Pack.

Warner W. Hodgdon Carolina 500
The Carolina 500 was originally scheduled for March 21 but due to rain it was postponed and held on March 28 at the North Carolina Motor Speedway. Benny Parsons won the pole with a speed of 141.577 mph.

Top Ten
27-Cale Yarborough
44-Terry Labonte
28-Benny Parsons
88-Bobby Allison
98-Morgan Shepherd
50-Joe Millikan
11-Darrell Waltrip
33-Harry Gant
67-Buddy Arrington
70-J. D. McDuffie

Time of Race: 4 hours 3 minutes 27 secondsCaution Flags: 9 for 86 lapsMargin of Victory: 1 lap
Cale Yarborough led 51 laps on way to his first Winston Cup victory of 1982.
Darrell Waltrip led 148 laps and finished 7th.
Neil Bonnett led 128 laps and finished 19th.
Gary Balough whom brought out the races final caution flag for a crash ended up finishing 12th. It was his last Cup Series race until 1991 as he was shortly after this event sentenced to prison for drug trafficking charges as was Billie Harvey, Tim Richmond's car owner.
Last Top 10 finish for J. D. McDuffie.

CRC Chemicals Rebel 500
The CRC Chemicals Rebel 500 was held on April 4 at the Darlington Raceway. Buddy Baker won his 1st pole since 1980 with a speed of 153.979 mph. He would then promptly finish last (37th) due to flywheel problems.

Top Ten
15-Dale Earnhardt
27-Cale Yarborough
9-Bill Elliott
28-Benny Parsons
2-Tim Richmond (R)
44-Terry Labonte
02-Mark Martin (R)
67-Buddy Arrington
37-Donnie Allison
24-Lennie Pond

Time of Race: 4 hours 3 minutes 27 secondsCaution Flags: 8 for 53 lapsMargin of Victory: 3 feet
Dale Earnhardt led 181 laps on way to his only Winston Cup victory of 1982 and his first victory in a Ford.

Northwestern Bank 400
The Northwestern Bank 400 was held on April 18 at the North Wilkesboro Speedway. Darrell Waltrip won the pole with a speed of 114.801 mph .

Top Ten
11-Darrell Waltrip
44-Terry Labonte
15-Dale Earnhardt
28-Benny Parsons
43-Richard Petty
33-Harry Gant
98-Morgan Shepherd
88-Bobby Allison
3-Ricky Rudd
37-Neil Bonnett

Time of Race: 2 hours 33 minutes 37 secondsCaution Flags: 6 for 34 lapsMargin of Victory: Under Caution
Darrell Waltrip led 345 of 400 laps on way to his third Winston Cup victory of 1982.

Virginia National Bank 500

The Virginia National Bank 500 was held on April 25 at the Martinsville Speedway. Terry Labonte won the pole with a speed of 89.988 mph.

Top Ten
33-Harry Gant
01-Butch Lindley
21-Neil Bonnett
3-Ricky Rudd
11-Darrell Waltrip
71-Dave Marcis
02-Mark Martin (R)
67-Buddy Arrington
40-Jimmy Hensley
48-Slick Johnson

Time of Race: 3 hours 30 minutes 1 secondsCaution Flags: 9 for 46 lapsMargin of Victory: 1 lap
Harry Gant led 167 laps on way to his first ever Winston Cup victory after finishing in 2nd place 9 different times.

Winston 500

The Winston 500 was held on May 2 at the Alabama International Motor Speedway. Benny Parsons won the pole with a speed of 200.176 mph.

Top Ten
11-Darrell Waltrip
44-Terry Labonte
28-Benny Parsons
42-Kyle Petty
98-Morgan Shepherd
37-Donnie Allison
2-Tim Richmond (R)
15-Dale Earnhardt
52-Jimmy Means
02-Mark Martin (R)

Time of Race: 3 hours 11 minutes 19 secondsCaution Flags: 8 for 39 lapsMargin of Victory: 3 car lengths
The lead changed 53 times among 13 drivers. Parsons drafted into the lead with three laps to go; on the final lap he swung low to break the draft, but Waltrip, Labonte, and Petty drafted past on the high side; Parsons edged Petty while Labonte's last-second bid for the win fell short. Darrell Waltrip led 54 laps on way to his fourth Winston Cup victory of 1982.
The race is also remembered for the bizarre story of the mysterious L. W. Wright, a con-artist pretending to be a NASCAR veteran. Wright started and finished near the back, then after the race disappeared after the checks for a NASCAR license and car bounced, going in hiding for almost 40 years until resurfacing for an interview with The Scene Vaults Rick Houston

Cracker Barrel Country Store 420
The Cracker Barrel Country Store 420 was held on May 8 at the Nashville Speedway. Darrell Waltrip won the pole with a speed of 102.773 mph.

Top Ten
11-Darrell Waltrip
44-Terry Labonte
47-Ron Bouchard
75-Joe Ruttman
37-Neil Bonnett
88-Bobby Allison
2-Tim Richmond (R)
71-Dave Marcis
43-Richard Petty
15-Dale Earnhardt

Time of Race: 2 hours 59 minutes 52 secondsCaution Flags: 5 for 39 lapsMargin of Victory: 1 lap
Darrell Waltrip led 419 of 420 laps on way to his fifth Winston Cup victory of 1982.

Mason-Dixon 500
The Mason-Dixon 500 was held on May 16 at the Dover Downs International Speedway. Darrell Waltrip won the pole with a speed of 139.308 mph .

Top Ten
88-Bobby Allison
71-Dave Marcis
15-Dale Earnhardt
44-Terry Labonte
02-Mark Martin (R)
47-Ron Bouchard
98-Morgan Shepherd
37-Donnie Allison
2-Tim Richmond (R)
17-Lake Speed

Time of Race: 4 hours 9 minutes 43 secondsCaution Flags: 6 for 32 lapsMargin of Victory: 3 laps
Allison led 488 of 500 laps for the first Winston Cup win by a car equipped with power steering and his second Winston Cup victory of 1982.

World 600

The World 600 was held on May 30 at the Charlotte Motor Speedway. David Pearson won the pole with a speed of 162.511 mph.

Top Ten
21-Neil Bonnett
9-Bill Elliott
88-Bobby Allison
27-Cale Yarborough
1-Buddy Baker
90-Jody Ridley
3-Ricky Rudd
43-Richard Petty
71-Dave Marcis
47-Ron Bouchard

Time of Race: 4 hours 36 minutes 48 secondsCaution Flags: 10 for 62 lapsMargin of Victory: 2 car lengths
Neil Bonnett won his only Winston Cup race of 1982. It was his final victory with Wood Brothers Racing.

Van Scoy Diamond Mine 500
The inaugural Van Scoy Diamond Mine 500 was held on June 6 at the Pocono International Raceway. Terry Labonte was on the pole because qualifying was rained out so the line up was set by the current Winston Cup points standings. This was the only time in 1982 that qualifying was rained out.

Top Ten
88-Bobby Allison
2-Tim Richmond (R)
28-Benny Parsons
33-Harry Gant
44-Terry Labonte
3-Ricky Rudd
43-Richard Petty
50-Geoff Bodine (R)
90-Jody Ridley
71-Dave Marcis

Time of Race: 4 hours 24 minutes 8 secondsCaution Flags: 7 for 51 lapsMargin of Victory: Under Caution
Bobby Allison led the most laps (75 of 200) in route to his third Winston Cup victory of 1982.
Darrell Waltrip led 10 laps and finished 13th.

Budweiser 400
The Budweiser 400 was held on June 13 at the Riverside International Raceway. Terry Labonte won the pole with a speed of 162.511 mph.

Top Ten
2-Tim Richmond (R)
44-Terry Labonte
50-Geoff Bodine (R)
15-Dale Earnhardt
21-Neil Bonnett
74-Roy Smith
90-Jody Ridley
02-Mark Martin (R)
47-Ron Bouchard
25-Jim Reich

Time of Race: 2 hours 23 minutes 51 secondsCaution Flags: 1 for 7 lapsMargin of Victory: 3.82 seconds
Rookie Tim Richmond led just 10 laps for his first ever Winston Cup victory.
Darrell Waltrip had a dismal day falling out of the race after 28 laps with a piston failure finishing 32nd with no laps led.
Bobby Allison didn't fare much better falling out of the race after 47 laps with engine failure but he led 15 laps.
Terry Labonte padded to his points lead by finishing 2nd and leading the most laps (64). Labonte now led by 144 points over Allison, 210 points over Waltrip.

Gabriel 400
The Gabriel 400 was held on June 20 at the Michigan International Speedway. Ron Bouchard won the pole (his second ever of a total three) with a speed of 162.404 mph.

Top Ten
27-Cale Yarborough
11-Darrell Waltrip
9-Bill Elliott
88-Bobby Allison
3-Ricky Rudd
42-Kyle Petty
15-Dale Earnhardt
98-Morgan Shepherd
50-Geoff Bodine (R)
33-Harry Gant

Time of Race: 3 hours 23 minutes 13 secondsCaution Flags: 3 for 42 lapsMargin of Victory: 3 car lengths
Cale Yarborough led 73 laps for his second Winston Cup victory of 1982.

Firecracker 400
The Firecracker 400 was held on July 4 at the Daytona International Speedway. Rookie Geoff Bodine won the first Winston Cup pole of his career (he would win 37 in his career) with a speed of 194.721 mph.

Top Ten
88-Bobby Allison
9-Bill Elliott
47-Ron Bouchard
98-Morgan Shepherd
03-David Pearson
50-Geoff Bodine (R)
3-Ricky Rudd
1-Buddy Baker
17-Lake Speed
71-Dave Marcis

Time of Race: 2 hours 27 minutes 9 secondsCaution Flags: 5 for 25 lapsMargin of Victory: 2 car lengths
Bobby Allison won his fourth Winston Cup race of 1982. He also led the most laps (112 of 160).

Busch Nashville 420
The Busch Nashville 420 was held on July 10 at the Nashville Speedway. Morgan Shepherd won the first Winston Cup pole of his career (he would win 7 in his career) with a speed of 103.959 mph.

Top Ten
11-Darrell Waltrip
44-Terry Labonte
33-Harry Gant
3-Ricky Rudd
2-Tim Richmond (R)
50-Geoff Bodine (R)
43-Richard Petty
90-Jody Ridley
15-Dale Earnhardt
47-Ron Bouchard

Time of Race: 2 hours 53 minutes 35 secondsCaution Flags: 5 for 24 lapsMargin of Victory: 1 lap
Darrell Waltrip led 400 of 420 laps for his sixth Winston Cup victory of 1982.

Mountain Dew 500
The Mountain Dew 500 was held on July 25 at the Pocono International Raceway. Cale Yarborough won the pole with a speed of 150.764 mph.

Top Ten
88-Bobby Allison
43-Richard Petty
44-Terry Labonte
47-Ron Bouchard
28-Buddy Baker
11-Darrell Waltrip
75-Joe Ruttman
71-Dave Marcis
67-Buddy Arrington
02-Mark Martin (R)

Time of Race: 4 hours 19 minutes 45 secondsCaution Flags: 6 for 43 lapsMargin of Victory: 17 seconds
Bobby Allison only led 16 laps but picked up his fifth Winston Cup victory of 1982.
Richard Petty led some 70 laps as the lead changed 46 times but had to pit for fuel with four laps remaining. Darrell Waltrip ran out of fuel coming out of turn one on the final lap.
The race saw a 23 lap caution period when Dale Earnhardt and Tim Richmond blasted the first turn boilerplate wall and track crews had to weld it back in place.

Talladega 500
The Talladega 500 was held on August 1 at the Alabama International Motor Speedway. Geoff Bodine won the second Winston Cup pole of his career with a speed of 199.4 mph.

Top Ten
11-Darrell Waltrip
28-Buddy Baker
43-Richard Petty
27-Cale Yarborough
44-Terry Labonte
9-Bill Elliott
2-Tim Richmond (R)
98-Morgan Shepherd
3-Ricky Rudd
88-Bobby Allison

Time of Race: 2 hours 58 minutes 26 secondsCaution Flags: 5 for 25 lapsMargin of Victory: 1 car length
Darrell Waltrip led 107 of 188 laps to pick up his seventh Winston Cup victory of 1982.

Champion Spark Plug 400

The Champion Spark Plug 400 was held on August 22 at the Michigan International Speedway. Just over a year after he won his first ever pole, Bill Elliott won the second Winston Cup pole of his career with a speed of 162.995 mph.

Top Ten
88-Bobby Allison
43-Richard Petty
33-Harry Gant
98-Geoff Bodine (R)
55-Benny Parsons
67-Buddy Arrington
11-Darrell Waltrip
71-Dave Marcis
21-Neil Bonnett
47-Ron Bouchard

Time of Race: 2 hours 45 minutes 53 secondsCaution Flags: 5 for 29 lapsMargin of Victory: 2 car lengths
Bobby Allison picked up his sixth Winston Cup victory of 1982.

Busch 500

The Busch 500 was held on August 28 at the Bristol International Raceway. Rookie Tim Richmond won the first Winston Cup pole of his career at a speed of 112.507 mph.

Top Ten
11-Darrell Waltrip
88-Bobby Allison
33-Harry Gant
44-Terry Labonte
98-Morgan Shepherd
15-Dale Earnhardt
3-Ricky Rudd
90-Jody Ridley
28-Buddy Baker
50-Geoff Bodine (R)

Time of Race: 2 hours 49 minutes 32 secondsCaution Flags: 3 for 15 lapsMargin of Victory: 0.70 seconds
Darrell Waltrip picked up his eighth Winston Cup victory of 1982. Bobby Allison would lead 169 laps but finish second.

Southern 500
The Southern 500 was held on September 6 at the Darlington Raceway. David Pearson won the pole with a speed of 155.739 mph.

Top Ten
27-Cale Yarborough
43-Richard Petty
15-Dale Earnhardt
9-Bill Elliott
28-Buddy Baker
17-Lake Speed
50-Geoff Bodine (R)
55-Benny Parsons
67-Buddy Arrington
71-Dave Marcis

Time of Race: 4 hours 21 minutes 32 secondsCaution Flags: 14 for 87 lapsMargin of Victory: 0.79 seconds
Cale Yarborough picked up his third Winston Cup victory of 1982. It was his last victory with the M.C. Anderson Racing team.
The lead changed 41 times among 17 drivers, the most competitive running in the event's history.

Wrangler Sanfor-Set 400
The Wrangler Sanfor-Set 400 was held on September 12 at the Richmond Fairgrounds Raceway. Bobby Allison won the pole with a speed of 93.435 mph.

Top Ten
88-Bobby Allison
2-Tim Richmond (R)
11-Darrell Waltrip
3-Ricky Rudd
21-Neil Bonnett
44-Terry Labonte
33-Harry Gant
71-Dave Marcis
28-Buddy Baker
17-Lake Speed

Time of Race: 2 hours 37 minutes 6 secondsCaution Flags: 2 for 12 lapsMargin of Victory: 17 seconds
Bobby Allison led the most laps (265 of 400) and picked up his seventh Winston Cup victory of 1982.

CRC Chemicals 500
The CRC Chemicals 500 was held on September 19 at the Dover Downs International Speedway. Ricky Rudd won the pole with a speed of 139.384 mph.

Top Ten
11-Darrell Waltrip
42-Kyle Petty
9-Bill Elliott
50-Geoff Bodine (R)
55-Benny Parsons
71-Dave Marcis
67-Buddy Arrington
47-Ron Bouchard
2-Tim Richmond (R)
88-Bobby Allison

Time of Race: 4 hours 38 minutes 43 secondsCaution Flags: 9 for 67 lapsMargin of Victory: 2 car lengths
Darrell Waltrip led the most laps (287 of 500) and picked up his ninth Winston Cup victory of 1982.

Holly Farms 400
The Holly Farms 400 was held on October 3 at the North Wilkesboro Speedway. Darrell Waltrip won the pole with a speed of 113.86 mph.

Top Ten
11-Darrell Waltrip
33-Harry Gant
44-Terry Labonte
43-Richard Petty
50-Geoff Bodine (R)
75-Joe Ruttman
47-Ron Bouchard
17-Lake Speed
90-Jody Ridley
42-Kyle Petty

Time of Race: 2 hours 32 minutes 57 secondsCaution Flags: 4 for 26 lapsMargin of Victory: 13.8 seconds
Darrell Waltrip for the second race in a row led the most laps (329 of 400 laps) and picked up the victory, his tenth Winston Cup victory of 1982.
The only other lap leader was Bobby Allison who led 71 laps but only completed 141 laps before having an engine problem.

National 500
The National 500 was held on October 10 at the Charlotte Motor Speedway. Darrell Waltrip won the pole with a speed of 164.694 mph.

Top Ten
33-Harry Gant
9-Bill Elliott
03-David Pearson
75-Joe Ruttman
55-Benny Parsons
28-Buddy Baker
90-Jody Ridley
43-Richard Petty
88-Bobby Allison
62-Rick Wilson

Time of Race: 3 hours 39 minutes 5 secondsCaution Flags: 6 for 34 lapsMargin of Victory: 2.93 seconds
Harry Gant won his second Winston Cup victory of 1982 (also second win of his career) after Bobby Allison, who led the most laps (280 of 334 laps), blew his engine with ten laps remaining.
This was Gant's first victory from pole position.
This was also David Pearson's 300th Winston Cup top five finish.
This was also Jody Ridley's 100th Winston Cup start. 
Richard Petty finished eighth despite damage in a ten-car crash started by Dale Earnhardt; Petty was unusually angry when Earnhardt blamed Petty for the crash.

Old Dominion 500
The Old Dominion 500 was held on October 17 at the Martinsville Speedway. Ricky Rudd won the pole with a speed of 89.132 mph.

Top Ten
11-Darrell Waltrip
3-Ricky Rudd
43-Richard Petty
44-Terry Labonte
75-Joe Ruttman
28-Buddy Baker
90-Jody Ridley
33-Harry Gant
52-Jimmy Means
67-Buddy Arrington

Time of Race: 3 hours 41 minutes 5 secondsCaution Flags: 10 for 70 lapsMargin of Victory: 2 seconds
Darrell Waltrip led the most laps (238 of 500) and picked up his eleventh Winston Cup victory of 1982.
Bobby Allison blew an engine after leading 98 laps and finished 19th.
Waltrip came into this race trailing Allison by 37 points. His victory and Allison's retirement meant Waltrip took over the points lead for the first time all season. Waltrip left Martinsville holding a 37-point lead over Allison.

Warner W. Hodgdon American 500
The Warner W. Hodgdon American 500 was held on October 31 at the North Carolina Motor Speedway. Cale Yarborough won the pole with a speed of 143.22 mph.

Top Ten
11-Darrell Waltrip
88-Bobby Allison
21-Neil Bonnett
44-Terry Labonte
98-Morgan Shepherd
43-Richard Petty
88-Buddy Baker
47-Ron Bouchard
48-Lennie Pond
6-D. K. Ulrich

Time of Race: 4 hours 20 minutes 47 secondsCaution Flags: 8 for 55 lapsMargin of Victory: 9.5 seconds
Darrell Waltrip won his twelfth Winston Cup victory of 1982.
Bobby Allison led the most laps (127 of 492 laps) but spun out of the pits on Lap 450. He recovered for a 2nd place finish but the difference between he & Waltrip would remain unchanged at 37 points.
Wood Brothers Racing with Neil Bonnett led 108 laps. Wood Brothers prepared cars would not lead 100 laps or more in a Cup Series race again until 2017 when Ryan Blaney led for 148 laps at Texas.

Atlanta Journal 500
The Atlanta Journal 500 was held on November 7 at the Atlanta International Raceway. Morgan Shepherd won the pole with a speed of 166.779 mph.

Top Ten
88-Bobby Allison
33-Harry Gant
11-Darrell Waltrip
2-Tim Richmond (R)
75-Joe Ruttman
71-Dave Marcis
3-Ricky Rudd
44-Terry Labonte
5-Rodney Combs
02-Mark Martin (R)

Time of Race: 3 hours 48 minutes 51 secondsCaution Flags: 10 for 56 laps45 lead changes among 14 driversMargin of Victory: 0.5 seconds
Bobby Allison led the most laps (100 of 328) and won his eighth Winston Cup victory of 1982.
This was the final Winston Cup race for country singer Marty Robbins before his death in December 1982.
Rodney Combs made his first NASCAR start in this race.
Heading into the season finale at Riverside, Waltrip had a 22 point lead over Allison.
This was Cale Yarborough's last race in the M. C. Anderson #27. He would complete 73 laps before blowing an engine finishing 35th. He would join Mizlou as the Driver Expert for the season finale at Riverside.

Winston Western 500

The Winston Western 500 was held on November 21 at the Riverside International Raceway. He had already locked up the season long pole award for winning the most poles but Darrell Waltrip added one more to his tally for his seventh pole of 1982 with a speed of 114.995 mph.

Top Ten
2-Tim Richmond (R)
3-Ricky Rudd
11-Darrell Waltrip
21-Neil Bonnett
02-Mark Martin (R)
47-Ron Bouchard
55-Benny Parsons
98-Morgan Shepherd
90-Jody Ridley
16-Jim Bown

Time of Race: 3 hours 7 minutes 24 secondsCaution Flags: 3 for 16 lapsMargin of Victory: 7 seconds
Tim Richmond led the most laps (92 of 119) and won his second Winston Cup victory of 1982. It was his final victory with the J. D. Stacy team.
Bobby Allison's title hopes ended on lap 111 of 119 when his engine failed - the fourth time in the last six races where engine trouble ended his race - and he finished 16th. It was Allison's last race with the number 88 and the last with sponsor Gatorade. Next season he would use number 22 and retain Miller High Life for sponsorship while staying with DiGard Racing.
Waltrip won his second straight title by 72 points over Allison.
By virture of finishing 8th & Dale Earnhardt finishing last (42nd), Morgan Shepherd was able to get to 10th in points while Earnhardt fell to 12th in the final standings. Jimmy Means finishing 12th in the race was the other reason for the 12th place final points standings as Means took 11th in the final standings, a career-best in the standings.
Conversely; Dale Earnhardt's 12th place finish in the standings would be the worst points finish of his career. A feat he would match in 1992, also recording only one victory that season as well.
This would be the last full time (entire season) race for Mark Martin in the Cup Series until 1988.
For the second straight season, Terry Labonte failed to win a race. However his consistency paid off with 3rd place in the final drivers points standings.

Full Drivers' Championship

(key) Bold – Pole position awarded by time. Italics – Pole position set by owner's points. * – Most laps led.

Rookie of the year
Geoff Bodine won the rookie of the year even though he only started 25 of the 30 races. However, he had 4 top fives, 10 top tens, 2 poles, and 118 laps led, he had a season long average finishing position of 15.16. Mark Martin, his closest competitor for the award, did start all 30 races but he only had 2 top fives, 8 top tens, 0 poles, and 4 laps led, he had a season long average finishing position of 19.47.

See also
1982 NASCAR Budweiser Late Model Sportsman Series

References

External links 
 Winston Cup Standings and Statistics for 1982

 

NASCAR Cup Series seasons